Johann Gottlieb Faber (1717–1779) was a Lutheran theologian of Germany.

Life 
Johann Gottlieb Faber was born at Stuttgart on 8 March 1717. He studied at Tübingen, and was appointed professor there in 1748. In 1767 he was made a member of the consistory and abbot of Alpirsbach. He died at Stuttgart on 18 March 1779.

Works 

 De Naturalismo Morali (Tübingen, 1752);
 De Anima Legum (Tübingen, 1752);
 De Principe Christiano (Tübingen, 1753);
 De Miraculis Christi (Tübingen, 1764);
 Meletema Philosophicum (Tübingen, 1765);
 De Diverssis Fontibus Tolerantiae (Tübingen, 1769);
 Theologia Dogmatica (Stuttgart, 1780).

References

Sources 

 Hartmann, Julius (1877). "Faber, Johann Gottlieb". In Allgemeine Deutsche Biographie (ADB). Vol. 6. Leipzig: Duncker & Humblot. pp. 496.

Attribution:

 Pick, B. (1887). "Faber, Johann Gottlieb". In McClintock, John; Strong, James (eds.). Cyclopædia of Biblical, Theological and Ecclesiastical Literature. Supplement.—Vol. 2. New York: Harper & Brothers. p. 369. 

1717 births
1779 deaths
18th-century German Lutheran clergy
18th-century German Protestant theologians
Academic staff of the University of Tübingen